The 2009 TEAN International was a professional tennis tournament played on outdoor red clay courts. It was the fourteenth edition of the tournament which was part of the 2009 ATP Challenger Tour. It took place in Alphen aan den Rijn, Netherlands between 7 and 13 September 2009.

Singles main draw entrants

Seeds

 Rankings are as of August 31, 2009.

Other entrants
The following players received wildcards into the singles main draw:
  Michel Koning
  Matwé Middelkoop
  Igor Sijsling
  Boy Westerhof

The following players received entry from the qualifying draw:
  Justin Eleveld
  Rameez Junaid
  Timo Nieminen
  Sebastian Rieschick (as a Lucky Loser)
  Thomas Schoorel

Champions

Singles

 Stéphane Robert def.  Michael Russell, 7–6(2), 5–7, 7–6(5)

Doubles

 Jonathan Marray /  Jamie Murray def.  Sergei Bubka /  Sergiy Stakhovsky, 6–1, 6–4

External links
Official site
ITF Search 

TEAN International
TEAN International
Tean